Freakatorium may refer to:

 Freakatorium, a museum of side show curiosities opened by Johnny Fox
 Freakatorium (album), a 1999 album by Keith LeBlanc